Fixed::Context is a studio album by the Virginian post-rock band Labradford. It was released in 2001 by Blast First and Kranky.

Critical reception
The Guardian wrote that the songs are "all instrumental and all based around an echoey guitar effect that sounds like Duane Eddy playing the theme to Twin Peaks." The Dallas Observer called the album "a patiently unfolding tapestry of forgotten memories and the subconscious pleasure of a mind set adrift."

Track listing

Personnel 
Adapted from the Fixed::Context liner notes.

Labradford
 Carter Brown – keyboards
 Robert Donne – bass guitar
 Mark Nelson – vocals, guitar

Production and additional personnel
 Steve Albini – production, recording, mixing
 Robert Gallerani – design
 Labradford – recording, mixing

Release history

References

External links 
 

2001 albums
Labradford albums
Blast First albums
Kranky albums
Albums produced by Steve Albini